Rhodopseudomonas julia is a bacterium from the genus of Rhodopseudomonas which was isolated from a sulfur spring from the Golovin Volcano on the Kunashir Island in Russia.

References

External links
Type strain of Rhodopseudomonas julia at BacDive -  the Bacterial Diversity Metadatabase

Nitrobacteraceae
Bacteria described in 1993